Pea Ridge is an unincorporated community in Desha County, Arkansas, United States. The community is located at the corner of Arkansas Highway 1 and Arkansas Highway 277.

References

Unincorporated communities in Desha County, Arkansas
Unincorporated communities in Arkansas